Robert Charles White (born 22 July 1935 in Stratford, Ontario) is a Canadian ice hockey player who competed in the 1956 Winter Olympics.

White was a member of the Kitchener-Waterloo Dutchmen who won the bronze medal for Canada in ice hockey at the 1956 Winter Olympics. He won the 1955 Allen Cup (All-Canada Senior Champions) with the Dutchmen, the 1953 Memorial Cup (All-Canada Junior Champions) with the Barrie Flyers, and was a two-time All-American and Assistant Captain at the University of Michigan (1957–58, 1958–59)

Awards and honours

References

External links

 Bob White's profile at Sports Reference.com

1935 births
Living people
Ice hockey players at the 1956 Winter Olympics
Olympic ice hockey players of Canada
Sportspeople from Stratford, Ontario
Medalists at the 1956 Winter Olympics
Olympic bronze medalists for Canada
Michigan Wolverines men's ice hockey players
AHCA Division I men's ice hockey All-Americans